The Old Brewery Mission is a resource for homeless men and women in Quebec, Canada.

History 
The Old Brewery was founded in 1889 by two women, Mina Douglas and Eva Findlay, who started serving hot meals to Montrealers in need.

In the early 20th century, the Old Brewery Mission gradually evolved from a soup kitchen to a full homeless shelter.

In 1998, its women's shelter, the Patricia Mackenzie Pavillion was opened.

Today, the Old Brewery Mission offers a wide variety of services to its homeless clientele, including food, shelter, reintegration programs, and mental health services.

References

External links
 Old Brewery Mission
 Le Devoir
 CBC News
 125 ans de la Mission Old Brewery
 Télé-Québec report on the PRISM program
 La Presse
 Le Huffington Post Québec
 Prix d'Excellence for Le Pont program
 BTMTL Live Eye: Old Brewery Mission

Homeless shelters in Canada
Homelessness charities
Non-profit organizations based in Montreal
Organizations established in 1889
Charities based in Canada
Homelessness in Canada
Ville-Marie, Montreal